Moray Leon Eby (October 15, 1877 – November 25, 1958) was an American football player and coach.  He served as the head football coach at Coe College from 1914 to 1942.  Eby played college football at the University of Iowa from 1897 to 1900. He was the captain of the 1899 Iowa Hawkeyes football team.

Eby was born on October 15, 1877 in Adair, Iowa.  He died at his home in Cedar Rapids, Iowa on November 25, 1958.

References

1877 births
1958 deaths
19th-century players of American football
American football tackles
Coe Kohawks athletic directors
Coe Kohawks football coaches
Iowa Hawkeyes football coaches
Iowa Hawkeyes football players
People from Adair County, Iowa
Players of American football from Iowa
Coaches of American football from Iowa